Ireland has been neutral in international relations since the 1930s. The nature of Irish neutrality has varied over time, and has been contested since the 1970s. Historically, the state was a "non-belligerent" in the Second World War (see Irish neutrality during World War II) and has never joined NATO, although during the Cold War it was anti-communist and aloof from the Non-Aligned Movement.  The compatibility of neutrality with Ireland's membership of the European Union has been a point of debate in EU treaty referendum campaigns since the 1990s. The Seville Declarations on the Treaty of Nice acknowledge Ireland's "traditional policy of military neutrality", reflecting the narrow formulation of successive Irish governments. Others define Irish neutrality more broadly, as having "a strong normative focus, with a commitment to development, United Nations peacekeeping, human rights and disarmament".

Ireland's concept of neutrality
There are notable differences between Irish neutrality and “traditional” types of neutral states:
Traditionally, neutral states maintain strong defence forces; Ireland has a relatively small defence force of approximately 10,500 personnel.
Traditionally, neutral states do not allow any foreign military within their territory; Ireland has a long history of allowing military aircraft of various nations to refuel at Shannon Airport. Under the Air Navigation (Foreign Military Aircraft) Order, 1952, the Minister for Foreign Affairs, exceptionally, could grant permission to foreign military aircraft to overfly or land in the state. Confirmation was required that the aircraft in question be unarmed, carry no arms, ammunition or explosives and that the flights in question would not form part of military exercises or operations.

After the September 11 attacks, these conditions were "waived in respect of aircraft operating in pursuit of the implementation of the United Nations Security Council Resolution 1368". Irish governments have always said that allowing aircraft to use Irish soil does not constitute participation in any particular conflict and is compatible with a neutral stance, instancing the transit of German troops between Finland and Norway through neutral Swedish territory during World War II.

A neutral state may also allow its citizens to serve in the armed forces of other, possibly belligerent, nations. Ireland does not restrict its citizens from serving in foreign armies, and significant numbers of Irish citizens serve or have served in the British, and to a lesser extent United States armies and the French Foreign Legion.

Legal status
Ireland's neutrality is in general a matter of government policy rather than a requirement of statute law. One exception is Article 29, section 4, subsection 9° of the Irish constitution:
The State shall not adopt a decision taken by the European Council to establish a common defence pursuant to Article 42 of the Treaty on European Union where that common defence would include the State.
This was originally inserted by the 2002 amendment ratifying the Treaty of Nice, and updated by the 2009 amendment ratifying the Treaty of Lisbon. An earlier bill intended to ratify the Treaty of Nice did not include a common defence opt-out, and was rejected in the first Nice referendum, in 2001.

The Defence Act 1954, the principal statute governing the Irish Defence Forces, did not oblige members of the Irish Army to serve outside the state (members of the Air Corps and Naval Service were not so limited). A 1960 amendment was intended to allow deployment in United Nations peacekeeping missions, and requires three forms of authorisation, which since the 1990s have come to be called the "triple lock":
 A UN Security Council resolution or UN General Assembly resolution;
 A formal decision by the Irish government;
 Approval by a resolution of Dáil Éireann (the lower house of the Oireachtas or parliament, to which the government is responsible).
These provisions were modified in 1993 to allow for Chapter VII missions and again in 2006 to allow for regionally organised UN missions.

History

Before independence

Before the creation of the Irish Free State, the whole island of Ireland was part of the United Kingdom of Great Britain and Ireland from 1801 to 1922; the pre-1801 Kingdom of Ireland was under siege of Britain (and before 1707 the Kingdom of England). While Irish unionists supported political integration with Britain, Irish nationalists were divided between those who envisaged some continuing link with Britain and the "advanced nationalists", mainly republicans, who wanted total independence. Separatists generally envisaged an independent Ireland being neutral, but were prepared to ally with Britain's enemies in order to secure that independence, reflected in the maxim "England's difficulty is Ireland's opportunity". Irish leaders in the Nine Years' War (1594–1603) allied with Spain. Wolfe Tone's 1790 pamphlet Spanish War claimed that Ireland was not obliged to support Britain if the Nootka Crisis started a war with Spain; Tone later sought France's aid for the United Irishmen Rebellion of 1798. At the outbreak of the First World War, James Connolly was president of the Irish Neutrality League and was prosecuted for a banner reading "We serve neither King nor Kaiser but Ireland"; Connolly and the other leaders of the 1916 Rising sought military aid from Germany, and some countenanced a German prince becoming king of independent Ireland. In the 1921 negotiations leading to the Anglo-Irish Treaty, Erskine Childers envisaged the Irish Republic having a neutral status guaranteed in international law on the model of Belgium and Switzerland. However, the Free State established under the Treaty as signed was a Dominion of the British Commonwealth, with the UK retaining responsibility for Ireland's marine defence as well as three naval bases, the "Treaty Ports".

Irish Free State
Article 49 of the 1922 Constitution of the Irish Free State stated, "Save in the case of actual invasion, the Irish Free State ... shall not be committed to active participation in any war without the assent of the Oireachtas [parliament]". In the Third Dáil debate on the draft constitution, the Provisional Government rejected a Labour Party amendment requiring assent of the electorate via referendum. Thomas Johnson argued "The war that is to be guarded against is a war overseas, is a war that this country may be drawn into by Parliament, by the will of Parliament perhaps, at the instigation of perhaps Canada, or perhaps Australia, or perhaps South Africa, or perhaps Great Britain, and the last is very much the more likely".

In the Statute of Westminster 1931, the UK renounced the right to legislate for the Free State. The 1938 Anglo-Irish Trade Agreement saw the Treaty Ports handed over to the Free State.

The Free State joined the International Committee for Non-Intervention in the Spanish Civil War. The Spanish Civil War (Non-Intervention) Act, 1937 made it an offence to travel from Ireland to Spain to fight for either side. This applied both to Irish citizens and nationals of other countries on the committee. Nevertheless, there was Irish involvement in the Spanish Civil War on both sides by private individuals and groups. Another statute related to the committee was the Merchant Shipping (Spanish Civil War) Act 1937, which restricted Irish shipping's access to Spain until 27 April 1939.

World War II
 
Ireland remained neutral during World War II. The Fianna Fáil government's position was flagged years in advance by Taoiseach Éamon de Valera and had broad support. James Dillon was the only member of Dáil Éireann to oppose it during the war, resigning from Fine Gael in 1942 and demanding that Ireland assist the Allies (while not necessarily declaring war on the Axis). However, tens of thousands of Irish citizens, who were by law British subjects, fought in the Allied armies against the Nazis, mostly in the British army. Senators John Keane and Frank MacDermot also favoured Allied support.

De Valera stated in his wartime speeches that small states should stay out of the conflicts of big powers; hence Ireland's policy was officially "neutral", and the country did not publicly declare its support for either side. In practice, while Luftwaffe pilots who crash-landed in Ireland and German sailors were interned, Royal Air Force (RAF), Royal Canadian Air Force (RCAF), and United States Army Air Forces (USAAF) pilots who crashed were released on personal assurances and usually allowed to cross the border into British territory (although some Allied personnel were also interned). The internees were referred to as "guests of the nation". The German embassy had to pay for their keep. If they were on a non-combative mission they were repatriated. While it was easy for Allied pilots to make that claim, it was not realistic for Luftwaffe pilots to make a similar claim. Towards the end of the war, the German embassy was unable to pay, so the internees had to work on local farms. Strict wartime press censorship had the effect of controlling a moral reaction to the war's unfolding events and reiterated the public position that Irish neutrality was morally superior to the stance of any of the combatants.

Allied aircraft were allowed to overfly County Donegal to bases in County Fermanagh. Many of these aircraft were manufactured in the United States, to be flown by the RAF. This was known as the Donegal Corridor. Navigational markings are still, faintly, visible on mountains, such as Slieve League. There were many unfortunate crashes into these mountains. The bodies of crashed allied airmen were repatriated by the Irish Army at the border, where they would be met by an Allied officer. The Irish delivered the bodies in covered trucks, the coffins draped with the Union Jack and the soldiers serving as an honour guard for the deceased. A chaplain was on hand to deliver a benediction. On at least one occasion, an Allied Air Force officer thanked his Irish counterpart for the honour they bestowed upon the repatriated airmen. The Irish captain was said to reply, "Ours may be the honour, but yours is the glory."

USAAF aircraft en route to North Africa refuelled at Shannon Airport, flying boats at nearby Foynes. A total of 1,400 aircraft and 15,000 passengers passed through Foynes airport during the war years.

In the course of the war, an estimated 70,000 citizens of neutral Ireland served as volunteers in the British Armed Forces (and another estimated 50,000 from Northern Ireland, and this figure does not include Irish people who were resident in Britain before the war (though many used aliases). Those who deserted the Irish Army to serve in the British Army, on returning to Ireland were stripped of all pay and pension rights, and banned for seven years from any employment paid for by state or government funds. Some 200,000 Irish migrated to England to work in the war economy— most of them stayed after the war. Those who went without proper papers were liable to be conscripted. Irish military intelligence (G2) shared information with the British military and even held secret meetings to decide what to do if Germany invaded Ireland to attack Britain, which resulted in Plan W, a plan for joint Irish and British military action should the Germans invade. However General Hugo McNeill, the commander of the Irish Second Division based on the Northern Ireland border, had private discussions with the German ambassador, Edouard Hempel, about German military assistance in the event of a British invasion from the north. De Valera declined Germany's offer of captured British weapons. The Germans did have a plan to simulate an invasion of Ireland called Operation Green, similar to the Allies' Operation Bodyguard, but it was only to be put into operation with Operation Sea Lion, the plan to conquer Britain.

Irish weather reports were crucial to the timing of the D-Day landings.

On Easter Tuesday, 15 April 1941, 180 Luftwaffe bombers attacked Belfast. De Valera responded immediately to a request for assistance from Basil Brooke, Prime Minister of Northern Ireland. Within two hours, 13 fire tenders from Dublin, Drogheda, Dundalk and Dún Laoghaire were on their way to assist their Belfast colleagues. De Valera followed up with his "they are our people" speech and formally protested to Berlin. Joseph Goebbels instructed German radio not to repeat their report of the raid, as Adolf Hitler was surprised at the Irish reaction, which might influence Irish Americans to bring the United States into the war. Although there was a later raid on 4 May, it was confined to the docks and shipyards (see Belfast blitz).

Ireland wanted to maintain a public stance of neutrality and refused to close the German and Japanese embassies. Unlike many other non-combatant states, Ireland did not declare war on the near-defeated Germany, and therefore did not seize any German assets. Other neutral countries like Sweden and Switzerland expelled German embassy staff at the end of the war, as they no longer represented a state, but the German legation in Dublin was allowed to remain open.

Irish neutrality during the war was threatened from within by the Irish Republican Army (IRA), which sought to provoke a confrontation between Britain and Ireland. This plan collapsed, however, when IRA chief of staff Seán Russell died in a U-boat off the Irish coast as part of Operation Dove; the Germans also later came to realise they had overestimated the capabilities of the IRA. The American ambassador, David Gray, stated that he once asked de Valera, early in the war, what he would do if German paratroopers "liberated" Derry. According to Gray, de Valera was silent for a time and then replied "I don't know." De Valera viewed the IRA threat to the authority of the state as sufficiently significant to intern 5,000 IRA members without trial at the Curragh Camp for the duration of the war.

In 1966, a forest in Israel was planted in Éamon de Valera's honour at Kfar Kana near Nazareth.

Many German spies were sent to Ireland, but all were captured quickly as a result of good intelligence and sometimes their ineptitude. The chief Abwehr spy was Hermann Görtz. In 1983, RTÉ made Caught in a Free State, a dramatised television series about Görtz and his fellow spies.

As the state was neutral, Irish cargo ships continued to sail with full navigation lights. They had large tricolours and the word "EIRE" painted large on their sides and decks. At that time, Allied ships travelled in convoy for protection from the U-boat wolfpacks. If a ship was torpedoed, it was left behind since the other ships could not stop for fear of becoming a target themselves. Irish ships often stopped, and they rescued more than 500 seamen, and some airmen, from many nations. However, many Irish ships were attacked by belligerents on both sides. Over 20% of Irish seamen, on clearly marked neutral vessels, died, in the Irish Mercantile Marine during World War II.

While civilian aircraft in other countries were frequently requisitioned for military purposes, Aer Lingus continued to fly a service between Dublin and Liverpool throughout the war.

Winston Churchill, the British wartime Prime Minister, made an attack on the Irish Government and in particular Éamon de Valera in his radio broadcast on VE Day. Churchill maintained that the British government displayed restraint on the Irish state while the de Valera government were allowed to "frolic with the Germans". Churchill maintained that the British could have invaded the Irish state, but displayed "considerable restraint" in not doing so. De Valera replied to Churchill in a radio broadcast:

Mr. Churchill makes it clear that in certain circumstances he would have violated our neutrality and that he would justify his action by Britain's necessity. It seems strange to me that Mr. Churchill does not see that this, if accepted, would mean that Britain's necessity would become a moral code and that when this necessity became sufficiently great, other people's rights were not to count....this same code is precisely why we have the disastrous succession of wars... shall it be world war number three?

Ireland applied to join the United Nations in 1945, but this was blocked by an objection by the Soviet Union in the security council. Seán MacBride considered that the UN boycott of Ireland was originally agreed to at the 1945 Yalta Conference by Churchill and Joseph Stalin. Despite MacBride's belief, the United Kingdom fully supported Ireland's applications to join the UN.(Ireland eventually joined the United Nations in 1955.)

The Cold War
During the Cold War, Ireland maintained its policy of neutrality. It did not align itself officially with NATOor the Warsaw Pact either. It refused to join NATO due to its sovereignty claims over Northern Ireland, which was administered by the United Kingdom, a NATO member. Ireland offered to set up a separate alliance with the United States but this was refused. This offer was linked in part to the $133 million received from the Marshall Aid Plan.

However, secret transmission of information from the government to the CIA started in 1955. The link was established by Liam Cosgrave via a Mr. Cram and the Irish embassy in London, and was not revealed until December 2007. In 1962–63, during the Cuban Missile Crisis, Seán Lemass authorised searches of aircraft that stopped over at Shannon en route between Warsaw Pact countries, and Cuba, for "warlike material".

European Union
Ireland applied to join the then European Communities in 1963 and finally acceded in 1973. Garret FitzGerald, who was Minister for Foreign Affairs 1973–77 and Taoiseach 1981–82 and 1982–87, claims that both Fianna Fáil and Fine Gael in the 1960s and 1970s accepted that European integration would eventually reach a point where Ireland would have to join in defence co-operation. FitzGerald points to Charles Haughey's opposition to the explicit mention of neutrality in a 1981 Dáil motion, stating that Haughey adopted a more pro-neutrality stance upon entering opposition later in 1981, and further in opposing sanctions against Argentina when it invaded the Falklands in 1982.

United Nations peacekeeping
Irish Defence Forces have seen active service as part of United Nations peacekeeping activitiesinitially in the early 1960s Congo Crisis, and subsequently in Cyprus (UNFICYP) and the Lebanon (UNIFIL).

Current policy
The 1994 coalition government's programme undertook not to change the policy of military neutrality without a referendum. That government's 1996 white paper on foreign policy stated:
The majority of the Irish people have always cherished Ireland's military neutrality, and recognise the positive values that inspire it, in peace-time as well as time of war. Neutrality has been the policy of the State in the event of armed conflict and has provided the basis for Ireland's wider efforts to promote international peace and security.
It recommended joining NATO's Partnership for Peace and participating in humanitarian missions of the Western European Union (WEU), but opposed joining NATO or the WEU as incompatible with military neutrality.

In February 2006, the Minister for Defence Willie O'Dea announced that the Irish government would open talks on joining the European Union battle groups. O'Dea said that joining the battlegroups would not affect Ireland's traditional policy of military neutrality, and that a UN mandate would be required for all battlegroup operations with Irish participation. Green Party foreign affairs spokesperson John Gormley condemned the decision, saying that the government was "discarding the remnants of Irish neutrality".

Under Enda Kenny, the Fine Gael party has questioned Irish neutrality, with Kenny claiming that "the truth is, Ireland is not neutral. We are merely unaligned."

In 2012, the Oireachtas established a joint committee to review petitions submitted by the public. An early petition sought clarification of government policy in relation to the use of Irish airspace by foreign military aircraft. In 2013–16 the committee held discussions with the petitioners, government members, the Secretary General of the Department of Foreign Affairs and Trade, and academics, and issued a report, which stated:
The Joint Committee note the lacuna between what is understood by the citizens by neutrality and what is the  position. Accordingly, the Joint Committee recommend that the Dáil and Seanad debate the matter of neutrality with a view to the holding of a Referendum so that the will of the people can be determined.

The 2011–2016 Fine Gael–Labour government published a 2015 foreign policy review which stated, "Our policy of military neutrality remains a core element of Irish foreign policy." The 2015 defence white paper presupposed "a policy of military neutrality which is characterised by non-membership of military alliances and non-participation in common or mutual defence arrangements", while engaging for peacekeeping purposes with the EU and NATO. An "Institute for Peace Support and Leadership Training" is to be established at the Curragh Camp; defence minister Simon Coveney said trainees from "non-neutral" countries would be permitted to enrol.

Ireland joined the EU's Permanent Structured Cooperation (PESCO) at its establishment in December 2017. The Fine Gael-led government said it would participate on a case-by-case basis and membership did not compromise neutrality. Fianna Fáil supported membership; Sinn Féin, the Greens, Solidarity, and People Before Profit opposed it; the Labour Party had reservations. In March 2018 Ireland expelled a Russian diplomat in protest at the poisoning of Sergei and Yulia Skripal in the UK. This decision was supported by Fianna Fáil and Labour and opposed by other opposition parties as compromising neutrality.

Recent conflicts

2001–2021 Afghanistan War
Despite its policy of neutrality, Ireland has supplied the NATO-led ISAF mission in the 2001–2021 Afghanistan War with a running total of 120 Irish troops as trainers. The troops are provided under United Nations mandate. As at 8 June 2011, there were seven personnel there.

2003 invasion of Iraq
The Fianna Fáil-led government did not take a position on the 2003 invasion of Iraq. Ireland, then a member of the UN Security Council, voted yes to Resolution 1441, which threatened "serious consequences" if Iraq did not comply with weapons inspectors. Some United States Air Force planes were allowed to refuel at Shannon Airport before and during the conflict, as were civilian aircraft transporting US military personnel; others had permission to overfly Irish air space. A resolution of the Dáil on 20 March 2003 approved these arrangements.

Anti-war activist Edward Horgan took a case in the High Court seeking several declarations that the government, in allowing use of Shannon, had breached the state's obligations as a neutral state. While the court held that the custom in international law was that "a neutral state may not permit the movement of large numbers of troops or munitions of one belligerent State through its territory en route to a theatre of war with another", it found this was not part of Irish domestic law, as Irish neutrality was "a matter of government policy only". It found that the Dáil resolution implied that the availability of Shannon did not constitute "participation" in the war, and that the courts had no power to overrule the Dáil on this question.

Prelude to the 2022 Russian invasion of Ukraine
In a Dáil discussion on the Russo-Ukrainian crisis in January 2022, Richard Boyd Barrett asked:
why is there no condemnation from a country that is supposed to be neutral of a clear agenda by NATO to expand eastwards and escalate military tensions with Russia? Why does the Government correctly condemn Russian military exercises in Irish waters but allow the US military to use Shannon Airport [?] ... Neutrality means not taking sides in dangerous conflicts and game-playing between major imperial powers.
Taoiseach Micheál Martin replied:
Ireland accepts Ukrainian territorial integrity [...] We're not politically neutral but we're military neutral. It's an important distinction. We're members of the European Union. We work with our European Union colleagues in terms of rules-based multilateral approaches to international disputes.

In response to Russia's invasion of Ukraine on 24 February 2022, the Tánaiste Leo Varadkar stated that while Ireland is not militarily aligned, the country is "not neutral at all" in relation to this conflict and that "support for Ukraine is unwavering and unconditional". Days later the Department of Foreign Affairs said it would "constructively abstain" from an EU fund for military aid to Ukraine, by contributing instead to a parallel non-lethal aid fund.

Weapons trade
A 2004 report by Forfás noted that the policy of neutrality is a factor in Ireland's lack of an arms industry and strict export controls on weapons. The latter were previously enforced by the Control of Exports (Goods and Technology) Order 2009, a statutory instrument made under the Control of Exports Act 1983. The 2009 order was replaced by the Control of Exports (Goods and Technology) Order 2012, which reflects the 2008 EU Common Position on Arms Exports. The 2004 Forfás report noted concerns about dual-use technology and the use as weapons components of products from major Irish export industries such as chemicals, telecommunications equipment, computer chips and software. The state is also bound by EU regulations and international arms control treaties. In 2017, four export licence applications were refused for dual-use items.

See also
Foreign relations of the Republic of Ireland
Ireland–NATO relations
Swedish neutrality
Swiss neutrality
History of Ireland
History of Northern Ireland
Conscription in Ireland
Irish Shipping Limited
Seville Declarations on the Treaty of Nice
Visa policy of Ireland

References

Sources

Citations

Further reading

External links
 Irish Peace and Neutrality Alliance
 Campaign for Irish Neutrality and Democracy
 Fine Gael "Beyond Neutrality" Document (pdf)
 Beyond Neutrality Questions and Answers 
 Second World War online resource for NI 

Foreign relations of Ireland
International relations theory
Non-interventionism